"E la luna bussò" (also graphically rendered  as "...e la luna bussò") is an Italian reggae ballad written by Mario Lavezzi, Oscar Avogadro and Daniele Pace  and performed by  Loredana Bertè. One of Bertè's major hits, it stayed on the Italian Singles Chart for 29 weeks.

Bertè also recorded a Spanish version of the song titled "Y la luna llamò". In 1997 Bertè recorded a new version of the song in duet with Francesca Alotta for the Alotta's album Buonanotte alla luna.

Track listing
7" single –  CGD 10181
 "E la luna bussò" (Mario Lavezzi, Oscar Avogadro, Daniele Pace) 
 "Folle città" (Oscar Avogadro, Alberto Radius)

Charts

References

 

1979 singles
1979 songs
Loredana Bertè songs
Songs written by Daniele Pace
Compagnia Generale del Disco singles
Songs written by Mario Lavezzi